Ophiopsiella is an extinct genus of prehistoric ray-finned fish.

Taxonomy

The type species, Ophiopsiella procera, described by Agassiz (1844), was previously considered by some authors to be the Ophiopsis type species. However, Lane and Ebert (2015) noted that Ophiopsis originally included O. muensteri only when first erected by Agassiz (1834), so they erected the new genus Ophiopsiella for Ophiopsis procera, referring "Ophiopsis" attenuata Wagner (1863), "Ophiopsis" penicillata Agassiz (1843), "Ophiopsis" breviceps Egerton (1852), "Ophiopsis" dorsalis Agassiz (1843), "Ophiopsis" montsechensis Wenz (1968) and "Ophiopsis" lepturus Bellotti (1857) to the genus.

See also

 Prehistoric fish
 List of prehistoric bony fish

References

Ionoscopiformes
Prehistoric ray-finned fish genera
Jurassic bony fish
Jurassic fish of Europe